= Sonic Booms in Atmospheric Turbulence =

Sonic Booms in Atmospheric Turbulence (SonicBAT) is an experiment of the Commercial Supersonic Technology Project, funded and operated by NASA.

SonicBAT investigated the effect of low-altitude turbulence on the loudness of sonic booms hitting the ground using an F/A-18 aircraft to generate sonic booms. The sonic booms and the weather data are then recorded using a TG-14, ground microphone array, and weather equipment.
